Golgi-associated PDZ and coiled-coil motif-containing protein is a protein that in humans is encoded by the GOPC gene.

PIST is a PDZ domain-containing Golgi protein. PDZ domains contain approximately 90 amino acids and bind the extreme C terminus of proteins in a sequence-specific manner.[supplied by OMIM]

Interactions
GOPC has been shown to interact with GRID2, BECN1, RHOQ, ACCN3, Cystic fibrosis transmembrane conductance regulator and CSPG5.

References

Further reading